Entrepreneurial Spark is the world's largest free business accelerator offering business support to start-up companies. Founded in Glasgow, Scotland, Entrepreneurial Spark is funded by private capital, contributions from public sector organisations, and corporate sponsorship.

Founded in January 2012, it has accelerators originally known as 'Hatcheries' based in Scotland, in Glasgow, Ayrshire and Edinburgh; in England in Birmingham, Bristol, Brighton, Leeds, Manchester, Milton Keynes and Newcastle and in Belfast, in Northern Ireland. An accelerator will open in London in 2017.

Entrepreneurs were originally known as 'Chiclets' and could initially stay for up to six months, receiving support and advice from mentors and enablers. Entrepreneurial Spark works closely with nearby universities including Glasgow Caledonian University. In 2014 Entrepreneurial Spark doubled their space and facilities to provide continued support to growing businesses and their teams.

History 
Entrepreneurial Spark was founded to support business start-ups in (and from) Scotland, through the development of entrepreneurial mindsets and behaviours. It was founded by Saltire Foundation fellow Jim Duffy and co-founder Brian McGuire, who featured the set up in the BBC Two Scotland Documentary 'The Entrepreneurs'. Businesses currently receiving support from Entrepreneurial Spark include Planitmoney Mo's Cookie Dough, Alphabet Babies, Flexiworkforce and Raptor Equipment among others.

Funding 
Entrepreneurial Spark is a not-for-profit social enterprise supported by business leaders including Lord William Haughey, Sir Tom Hunter, and Ann Gloag OBE, local councils including Glasgow City Council, East Ayrshire Council, and South Ayrshire Council as well as gaining backing from politicians including Alex Salmond and Ed Miliband. The scheme has also secured a three-year sponsorship package with The Royal Bank of Scotland, including funds to send aspiring entrepreneurs to Babson College in the USA.

Entrepreneurial Spark worked with the Scottish Government to develop the £1 Million EDGE fund for entrepreneurs in Scotland.

References

Organisations based in Glasgow
Business incubators of the United Kingdom
2012 establishments in Scotland
Organizations established in 2012